Hartley Mauditt is an abandoned village in the East Hampshire district of Hampshire, England. It is in the civil parish of Worldham.

The settlement appears to have been uninhabited since the 18th century, except for a couple of scattered cottages. Dating from the 12th century, St Leonard's church stands as the only remaining building of the former village.

Geography
The remaining houses include a 17th-century thatched cottage, an old rectory, and the converted village school on the parish boundary adjoining West Worldham.

History
Hartley Mauditt was first documented in the Domesday Book as "Herlege" (meaning hartland or woodland); "Hartley" signifies a pasture for deer. The manor had been granted to William de Maldoit (by corruption rendered Mauditt) by William the Conqueror. Later, it was in the possession of John of Gaunt, the Duchy of Lancaster, the Crown, and then in 1603 to Nicholas Steward (1547-1633).

In 1790, the 4th Baronet of Hartley Mauditt, Sir Simeon Henry Stuart, sold the manor to Henry Bilson-Legge whose son pulled down the manor house in 1798. After the demolition of the house the village of Hartley Mauditt declined, and eventually left the church as one of the few remaining buildings in the site of the settlement.

References

External links

Villages in Hampshire